The 1993–94 California Golden Bears men's basketball team represented the University of California, Berkeley in the 1993–94 season.

Led by head coach Todd Bozeman, the Bears finished the regular season with a record of 22–7, and a record of 13–5 in the Pac-10, placing them second. The Bears would receive an at-large bid into the NCAA tournament where they would fall in the first round to Green Bay. Following the season, Sophomore guard Jason Kidd would declare eligibility for the NBA draft, and begin a career in which he would play for the Dallas Mavericks, New Jersey Nets, Phoenix Suns, and New York Knicks. In his NBA career, Kidd would become a consistent all-star and win one NBA Championship, in 2011. In 2018, Kidd would be inducted into the NBA Hall of Fame.

Roster

Schedule and results

|-
!colspan=9 style=| Regular Season

|-
!colspan=9 style=| NCAA Tournament

Rankings

Team players drafted into the NBA

References

California Golden Bears men's basketball seasons
California
California
California Golden Bear
California Golden Bear